WorkJam Co., Ltd. (株式会社ワークジャム Work Jam Co., Ltd.) was a Japanese video game and software development company. Its main headquarters were located in Chiyoda, Tokyo.

History 
WorkJam was founded by Yutaka Kaminaga on December 15, 1998. In 1998 they released their first title in Japan, an adventure game titled Cross Tantei Monogatari. In 1999, Data East licensed out the Tantei Jingūji Saburō series (aka Jake Hunter) to WorkJam. In 2002, it released the first of these licensed games, titled Tantei Jingūji Saburō: Innocent Black. Full rights to the series were given to WorkJam after Data East went bankrupt in 2003.

In 2011, WorkJam closed down, passing responsibilities for the part-developed Fukushū no Rondo to co-developer Arc System Works. The company's social game business was purchased by CommSeed and Cykan Holdings at the end of the same year.

On February 6, 2017, Arc System Works announced that they had acquired the rights to all of the ex-WorkJam properties which had passed to Expris, namely the Jake Hunter, Theresia, Nazo no Jikenbo, and Koneko no Ie series.

Titles 
 Cross Tantei Monogatari (Sega Saturn, 1998; PlayStation, 1999)
 Cross Tantei Monogatari 1: Zenpen (Major Wave Series) (PlayStation, 2000)
 Cross Tantei Monogatari 1: Kōhen (Major Wave Series) (PlayStation, 2000)
 Tantei Jingūji Saburō: Innocent Black (PlayStation 2, 2002)
 Zero4 Champ: Drift Champ (PlayStation 2, 2002)
 Tantei Jingūji Saburō: KIND OF BLUE (PlayStation 2, 2004)
 Tantei Jingūji Saburō: Shiroi Kage no Shōjo (Game Boy Advance, 2005)
 Tantei Jingūji Saburō DS: Inishie no Kioku (Nintendo DS, 2007)
 Tantei Jingūji Saburō DS: Kienai Kokoro (Nintendo DS, 2008)
 Gakkou no Kowai Uwasa: Hanako-San ga Kita!! Minna no Hanako-San (Nintendo DS, 2008)
 Theresia: Dear Emile (Nintendo DS, 2008)
 Jake Hunter: Seaside City Conspiracy (iOS, 2008)
 Jake Hunter: A Ring with Memories (iOS, 2008)
 Jake Hunter: Crash and Burn (iOS, 2009)
 Jake Hunter: Waiting for Sunrise (iOS, 2009)
 Jake Hunter: A Decisive Move (iOS, 2009)
 Theresia: Dear Martel (iOS, 2009)
 Tantei Jingūji Saburō DS: Fuserareta Shinjitsu (Nintendo DS, 2009)
 Tantei Jingūji Saburō: Ashes and Diamonds (Nintendo DS, 2009)
 Koneko no Ie: Kirishima-ke to Sanbiki no Koneko (Nintendo DS, 2010)
 Tantei Jingūji Saburō DS: Akai Chō (Nintendo DS, 2010)
 Tantei Jingūji Saburō: Fukushū no Rondo (Nintendo 3DS, 2012)

References 

Video game development companies
Video game companies of Japan